Prunty is an unincorporated community in Ritchie County, in the U.S. state of West Virginia.

History
A post office called Prunty was in operation between 1902 and 1953. The community was named after the local Prunty family.

References

Unincorporated communities in Ritchie County, West Virginia
Unincorporated communities in West Virginia